is a 19-volume manga series by Masahiro Shibata (ja) which ran in Hana to Yume magazine from 1981 to 1987 as part of the Akai Kiba series of stories.  A five episode anime OVA series was adapted from the manga by Mushi Production and released in 1989. The OAV series was licensed and released on VHS and LaserDisc in North America by Central Park Media in 1990. A dubbed version was released on VHS by Manga Entertainment in 1997.

Characters

Lan was in a plane crash with her parents just after she was born, and she was raised by wolves for five years. She possess the latent esper abilities which identify her as the "Crimson Fang".

Sonnet is a 16-year-old esper cyborg soldier with silver hair (though it is blue in the OAV) who works as a scout for Talon. Her mother is Puerto Rican and her father is Russian, and she was raised in the slums of New York. When she was about 13 years old, her latent esper abilities began randomly manifesting themselves, causing people to label her a "witch" or a "devil child", and this caused her mother to have to turn to prostitution for money.

She was tricked into believing her mother was going to be killed, which caused her latent esper powers to fully manifest. Because of this, she now works as a scout for Talon, mercilessly hunting down espers such as Lan. Her interaction and blooming friendship with Lan and others at the school, however, have caused her to remember her humanity and she begins to question her loyalties to Talon. She finally learns from Lan's boyfriend Bird what real love is.

Dr. Merekes, a German scientist of Jewish descent, manages the cyborg division of Talon. He is a recognized authority in cybernetic engineering, and is the one responsible for Sonnet's and Bird's cyborg capabilities. While he is generally a cool-headed person, his growing parental love for Sonnet is his eventual undoing.

A first year student at Seiryō Academy who looked up to Bird. He feels responsible for Ran's injuries, and thinks that her powers are caused in part by the blood transfusion she received. He is always helping her.

Jin is a novelist. After learning about Talon after being involved in an incident with Lan, he supports her however he can.

Often nicknamed Bird, he is a delinquent offered room and board at Seiryō Academy in exchange for working there in the dining hall. He was good friends with Lan, but Talon kills him. They then take his remains and turn him into the cyborg RX-606, and he seeks out Lan again.

The daughter of Professor Onagara and a powerful esper whose abilities include clairvoyance, telepathy, and precognition. Due to a fiery incident in her past, she is unable to see, hear, or speak due to the burns she received. She is currently an ally of Lan and intent on attacking Talon.

Daisuke is the son of Jin Kiryuu and a student at Ōsei Academy.

A student at Ōsei Academy. She works in the library and is Lan's best friend. She's been raised as a foster daughter by the Haibara family. She has a crush on Daisuke.

Others
Dr. Kaburagi (Miyoko Asō)
Kyouko Sodeki (Mari Yokō)
Tsunaga (Kōzō Shioya)
Mikura (Kōichi Kitamura)
Okano (Seiko Nakano)
Ina (Issei Futamata)
Yumi (Yuko Minaguchi)
Editor Kouji Kubo (Kazumi Tanaka)
Race Track Announcer (Yukimasa Kishino)
Researcher (Hideyuki Umezu)
Guard (Junji Kitajima)
Doctor (Hiroyuki Satō)
Squad Leader (Hirohiko Kakegawa)

Story
The opening credits for each episode show Sonnet's former life and give hints about her powers. In the battle between the two powerful espers, Sonnet starts to rediscover her humanity, while Lan has to fight to keep her humanity, and control the Crimson Fang powers.

Sources:

OVA staff
Director: Takeyuki Kanda
Creator: Masahiro Shibata
Screenplays: Seiji Matsuoka, Kōichi Mizuide
Producer: Yukihiro Shino
Character Designs: Katsuichi Nakayama
Mechanical Designs: Masahito Yamashita
Storyboards: Yūichirō Yokoyama
Production: Mushi Productions
Production Cooperation: Tatsunoko Production

Sources:

Reception
The OVA series has been described as "a visual delight" which "harkens back to a simpler age, when the important thing was that the characters looked cute and the action looked cool", even though the "plot fits together, but only barely". While based on shōjo manga, the series contains intense and graphic violence, which is not typical for most shōjo works. The anime is considered "a little bit better than average, though it "doesn't feel finished", but it is "better than the vast majority of 'magical warrior series.

References

External links

Review by Justin Sevakis as part of his Pile of Shame column at Anime News Network

1989 anime OVAs
Adventure anime and manga
Central Park Media
Hakusensha franchises
Hakusensha manga
Mushi Production
Science fiction anime and manga
Tatsunoko Production